Richard Ocran (born 26 October 1993) is a Ghanaian  defender who plays for Zambian Premier League club Nkana.

Career
Ocran started his soccer career at Real Tamale United before moving to Amidaus Professionals F.C. After featuring for Amidaus, Ocran moved on to play for Dreams F.C. In January 2017, Ocran joined Ghana Premier Division club Ashanti Gold S.C.

Nkana
In January 2018, Ocran signed with Zambian Premier League club Nkana following the termination of his contract at AsantiGold SC.

References

External links
   
 
 
 

1993 births
Living people
Ghanaian footballers
Ghanaian expatriate footballers
Ashanti Gold SC players
Ghana international footballers
Association football central defenders
Ghana Premier League players
Nkana F.C. players
Real Tamale United players